Darrell Peart (born November 18, 1950) is an American furniture maker and designer, best known for his Greene and Greene style pieces.

Publications
Greene and Greene: Design Elements for the Workshop
Linden Publishing (April 1, 2006)

References

External links
 Darrell Peart Furnituremaker - Peart's website
 The Guru of Greene and Greene - Robb Report article about Peart
 Woodworkers Journal - Interview
 Fine Woodworking Magazine - Profile

1950 births
Living people
American furniture designers
American woodworkers
American furniture makers